Ghughi is a 2018 Pakistani drama serial based on Amrita Pritam's 1950 novel Pinjar. This drama is directed by Iqbal Hussain, written by Amna Mufti and produced by Cereal Entertainment. It originally aired on TV One Pakistan. It stars Adnan Siddiqui as Rasheed and Amar Khan as Nirmala in lead roles.

Plot 
It is the story of passionate love and overpowering hate—set against the violent, bloody upheaval of Partition. A beautiful and young Hindu girl Nirmala is kidnapped the night before her wedding by Rasheed, a young  Muslim man, to avenge his family's honour. Nirmala's family is devastated and to atone for this mishap they marry off her younger sister Nikki to Nirmala's fiancée Takh Chand. While Nikki and Takh Chand are distressed on their forced marriage, its Nirmala who faces isolation and extreme hatred of Rasheed's family.

Cast 
Adnan Siddiqui as Rasheed a.k.a. Sheeda
Amar Khan as Nirmala a.k.a. Nimmo
Mohsin Gillani as Deewan Chand
Asma Abbas as Parwati
Haris Waheed as Sukh Chand
 Khalid Butt as Lal Chand
Tahira Imam as Nadini
Hamza Firdous as Tek Chand
Raheela Agha as Sajid's wife
Ahmad Mohsin as Bashir
Muhammad Umar Khan as Raja Jee
Farah Tufail as Inayat Bibi
Yasmeen Hashmi as Nikki
Hamna Amir as Choti
Rashid Mehmood as Sajjad
Umer Darr
Ahmed Mohsin as Akrama

Accoldaes

Nominations
 18th Lux Style Awards - Best TV Writer - Amna Mufti
 18th Lux Style Awards - Best Original Soundtrack - Naveed Nashad & Beena Khan

References

External links
Official website

Pakistani drama television series
Urdu-language television shows
TVOne Pakistan
2018 Pakistani television series debuts
2018 Pakistani television series endings
Partition of India in fiction
Television series set in Punjab, Pakistan
Television shows set in Punjab, India
Television shows based on Indian novels
Television series set in the 1940s
Pakistani television dramas based on novels
Pakistani period television series